Appetite Production is a Polish film production company, based in Krakow, Poland. The company was founded in 2008 by Joanna Szymanska and Aleksandra Swierk both of which had previous experience in film production, working as production managers for multiple shorts produced by University of Silesia Film and Television Department. 

Appetite’s first production was an independent live action short comedy Merry Christmas with Jason Nwoga and directed by Tomasz Jurkiewicz. Film, released in April 2009, received positive reviews and won several awards on Polish independent film festivals, including Special Audience Award at 10th Era New Horizons Film Festival.

The company acts not only as an independent producer and co-producer for international projects, but also provides film production services for domestic and foreign companies. Latest result of such involvement is an apocalyptic feature directed by acknowledged Polish painter Wilhelm Sasnal – The Fallout – produced in cooperation with Sadie Coles HQ art gallery.

Filmography 

2010 – The Fallout (PL Opad, feature; dir. Wilhelm Sasnal, Anka Sasnal) – Executive Producer

2010 – World according to Hania and Stas (PL: Swiat wedlug Hani i Stasia, documentary; dir. Tomasz Jurkiewicz) - Producer

2009 – Merry Christmas (PL: Wesolych Swiat, short live action; dir. Tomasz Jurkiewicz) – Producer 

2008 – Fuse TV Excellent Adventure Castle Party Bolkow – Polish Unit Production Management

External links 
 Appetite Production official website 
 Appetite Production listed by Polish Audiovisual Producers Chamber of Commerce (KIPA) 
 New film by Wilhelm Sasnal premieres in London 
 Appetite Production at Short Film Corner Cannes 2009 
 Joanna Szymanska in Polish Film Database 
  Aleksandra Swierk in Polish Film Database 

Film production companies of Poland
Companies based in Kraków
Mass media companies established in 2008
Mass media in Kraków
Polish companies established in 2008